Thomas Glen-Coats may refer to:

Sir Thomas Glen-Coats, 1st Baronet (1846–1922), Scottish thread-maker and politician
Sir Thomas Glen-Coats, 2nd Baronet (1878–1954), Olympic gold medalist, son of the above

See also
Thomas Coats (disambiguation)
Thomas Coates (disambiguation)
Thomas Glenn (disambiguation)